The year 650 BC was a year of the pre-Julian Roman calendar. In the Roman Empire, it was known as year 104 Ab urbe condita . The denomination 650 BC for this year has been used since the early medieval period, when the Anno Domini calendar era became the prevalent method in Europe for naming years.

Events
 A climate change occurs in Europe, affecting all the Bronze Age cultures with colder and wetter climate, and tribes from Scandinavia migrate south into the European continent.
 Wine pitcher (oenochoe) from Rhodes is begun, finished in 625 BC. It is now at the Museum of Fine Arts, Boston.
 The city of Ancient Carthage acquires independence from Tyre.

Births

Deaths
 Mentuemhat, Theban Egyptian official

References